Islamic Republic of Iran Armed Forces awards and decorations are the collections of military awards which granted to Iranian military based on their performance history. One of the most common awards are Medals. The Medal is a symbol that, with the agreement of the Commander-in-Chief of the Iranian Armed Forces, is accorded to the armed forces in order to appreciate, encourage and strengthen the morale. Recipients will be allowed to install these medals on their identical clothing in accordance with the specific instructions of each medal. Before the Islamic Revolution, various military awards and decorations were used. After the revolution, while many signs of the Imperial era were obsolete, new titles were planned to design to thank the efforts of the armed forces of the Islamic Republic of Iran. Among the military honors created by the Persian Empire, medals of Zolfaghar, Knowledge, Razi, Art and Sports are still being used. The first presentation ceremony of military awards for Iranian commanders in Iran was held on September 27, 1989, on the day of Operation Samen-ol-A'emeh.

Order of precedence
While each service has its own order of precedence, the following general rules typically apply to all services:

 Superior badges of Honors
 Service or Skill special badge or ribbon bars.

Superior badges of Honors

Service or Skill special badge or ribbon bars

Army

Ground Force

Navy

Air Force

Air Defense Force

Islamic Revolutionary Guard Corps

Islamic Republic of Iran Police

References 

Iranian military-related lists